Live at the Rainbow is the first live video recorded by Iron Maiden on 21 December 1980 and released in 1981. It includes one of the band's earliest concerts with guitarist Adrian Smith as well as a very early version of "Killers", with lyrics that differ from the album version that would be released in 1981. Paul Di'Anno later admitted writing the lyrics five minutes before going on stage that night.

Due to technical problems, a sound line broke down halfway through the show. As a result, the audience were allowed to stay after the show to watch the band perform "Iron Maiden" and "Phantom of the Opera" again for the recording.

This concert is included on disc 1 of The History of Iron Maiden – Part 1: The Early Days DVD.

In addition, the cuts "Iron Maiden" and "Wrathchild" from this video received heavy rotation on MTV during its first hours on the air.

Track listing
All tracks are written by Steve Harris, except where noted.

 "The Ides of March" (intro)
 "Wrathchild"
 "Killers" (Harris, Paul Di'Anno)
 "Remember Tomorrow" (Harris, Di'Anno)
 "Transylvania" (instrumental)
 "Phantom of the Opera"
 "Iron Maiden"

Credits
 Paul Di'Anno – vocals
 Dave Murray – guitar
 Adrian Smith – guitar
 Steve Harris – bass
 Clive Burr – drums

References

Iron Maiden video albums